Red River Valley Council may be:

Red River Valley Council (North Dakota)
Red River Valley Council (Texas)
Red River Area Council (Oklahoma)